Hohenruppersdorf is a town in the district of Gänserndorf in the Austrian state of Lower Austria.

Geography
Hohenruppersdorf lies in the hills of the eastern Weinviertel in Lower Austria, about 3 km east of Bad Pirawarth and Gaweinstal. About 30 percent of the municipality is forested.

References

Cities and towns in Gänserndorf District